Sávio Antônio Alves (born 26 May 1995), known simply as Sávio, is a Brazilian footballer who plays as a left back for Portuguese club Rio Ave.

Club career
Sávio began his professional career with Ferroviária in 2016. He then had a series of loan spells at various clubs, most notably at Ferroviário-CE in 2018, winning the 2018 Série D title, and at América Mineiro between 2019 and 2021, finishing as runner-ups in the 2020 Série B and clinching promotion to the top national division. On 1 February 2021, he moved to Portuguese club Rio Ave.

Honours
Ferroviário-CE
Campeonato Brasileiro Série D: 2018

References

External links
 

1995 births
People from Araraquara
Footballers from São Paulo (state)
Living people
Brazilian footballers
Association football defenders
Associação Ferroviária de Esportes players
União Agrícola Barbarense Futebol Clube players
Campinense Clube players
Ferroviário Atlético Clube (CE) players
Londrina Esporte Clube players
América Futebol Clube (MG) players
Goiás Esporte Clube players
Rio Ave F.C. players
Campeonato Brasileiro Série A players
Campeonato Brasileiro Série B players
Campeonato Brasileiro Série D players
Primeira Liga players
Liga Portugal 2 players
Brazilian expatriate footballers
Brazilian expatriate sportspeople in Portugal
Expatriate footballers in Portugal